Marthe Villalonga (born 20 March 1932) is a French actress. She was born in Fort-de-l'Eau, Algeria.

Theatre

Filmography

External links

1932 births
Living people
French film actresses
People from Bordj El Kiffan
Pieds-Noirs
20th-century French actresses
21st-century French actresses
French television actresses
French stage actresses